The zoo hypothesis speculates on the assumed behavior and existence of technologically advanced extraterrestrial life and the reasons they refrain from contacting Earth. It is one of many theoretical explanations for the Fermi paradox. The hypothesis states that alien life intentionally avoids communication with Earth to allow for natural evolution and sociocultural development, and avoiding interplanetary contamination, similarly to people observing animals at a zoo. The hypothesis seeks to explain the apparent absence of extraterrestrial life despite its generally accepted plausibility and hence the reasonable expectation of its existence. A variant on the zoo hypothesis suggested by the former MIT Haystack Observatory scientist John Allen Ball is the "laboratory" hypothesis, where humanity is being subjected to experiments, with Earth being a giant laboratory.

Aliens might, for example, choose to allow contact once the human species has passed certain technological, political, or ethical standards. They might withhold contact until humans force contact upon them, possibly by sending a spacecraft to planets they inhabit. Alternatively, a reluctance to initiate contact could reflect a sensible desire to minimize risk. An alien society with advanced remote-sensing technologies may conclude that direct contact with neighbors confers added risks to oneself without an added benefit. In the related laboratory hypothesis, the zoo hypothesis is extended such that the 'zoo keepers' are subjecting humanity to experiments, a hypothesis which Ball describes as "morbid" and "grotesque", overlooking the possibility that such experiments may be altruistic, i.e., designed to accelerate the pace of civilization to overcome a tendency for intelligent life to destroy itself, until a species is sufficiently developed to establish contact, as in the zoo hypothesis.

Assumptions
The zoo hypothesis assumes, first, that whenever the conditions are such that life can exist and evolve, it will, and secondly, there are many places where life can exist and a large number of alien cultures in existence. It also assumes that these aliens have great reverence for independent, natural evolution and development. In particular, assuming that intelligence is a physical process that acts to maximize the diversity of a system's accessible futures, a fundamental motivation for the zoo hypothesis would be that premature contact would "unintelligently" reduce the overall diversity of paths the universe itself could take. 

These ideas are perhaps most plausible if there is a relatively universal cultural or legal policy among a plurality of extraterrestrial civilizations necessitating isolation with respect to civilizations at Earth-like stages of development. In a universe without a hegemonic power, random single civilizations with independent principles would make contact. This makes a crowded universe with clearly defined rules seem more plausible.

If there is a plurality of alien cultures, however, this theory may break down under the uniformity of motive concept because it would take just a single extraterrestrial civilization to decide to act contrary to the imperative within human range of detection for it to be undone, and the probability of such a violation of hegemony increases with the number of civilizations. This idea, however, becomes more plausible if all civilizations tend to evolve similar cultural standards and values with regard to contact much like convergent evolution on Earth has independently evolved eyes on numerous occasions, or all civilizations follow the lead of some particularly distinguished civilization, such as the first civilization among them.

Fermi paradox

A modified zoo hypothesis is a possible solution to the Fermi paradox. The time between the emergence of the first civilization within the Milky Way and all subsequent civilizations could be enormous. Monte Carlo simulation shows the first few inter-arrival times between emergent civilizations would be similar in length to geologic epochs on Earth. The zoo hypothesis assumes a civilization may have a ten-million, one-hundred-million, or half-billion-year head start on humanity, i.e., it may have the capability to completely negate our best attempts to detect it.

The zoo hypothesis relies in part on applying the concept of hegemonic power to the Fermi paradox. Even if a first hegemonic non-interventionist grand civilization (first civilization) is long gone, their initial legacy could persist in the form of a passed-down tradition, or perhaps in an artificial lifeform (artificial superintelligence) dedicated to a non-interventionist hegemonic goal without the risk of death. Thus, the hegemonic power does not even have to be the first civilization, but simply the first to spread its non-interventionist doctrine and control over a large volume of the galaxy. If just one civilization acquired hegemony in the distant past, it could form an unbroken chain of taboo against rapacious colonization in favour of non-interference in any civilizations that follow. The uniformity of motive concept previously mentioned would become moot in such a situation. The main problem would be how a galaxy-wide civilization would block Earth from receiving all intentional or unintentional communications.

Nonetheless, if the oldest civilization still present in the Milky Way has, for example, a 100-million-year time advantage over the next oldest civilization, then it is conceivable that they could be in the singular position of being able to control, monitor, influence or isolate the emergence of every civilization that follows within their sphere of influence. This is analogous to what happens on Earth within our own civilization on a daily basis, in that everyone born on this planet is born into a pre-existing system of familial associations, customs, traditions and laws that were already long established before our birth and which we have little or no control over.

METI (Messaging Extraterrestrial Intelligence) 

Overcoming the zoo hypothesis is one of the goals of METI, an organization created in 2015 to communicate with extraterrestrials, an active form of the search for extraterrestrials (SETI). METI, however, has been criticized for not representing humanity's collective will and for potentially endangering humanity.

Criticism
Some critics of the hypothesis say that only a single dissident group in an alien civilization, or alternatively the existence of galactic cliques instead of a unified galactic club, would be enough to break the pact of no contact. To Stephen Webb, it seems unlikely, taking humans as reference, that such prohibition would be in effect for millions of years without a single breach thereof. Others say that the zoo hypothesis, along with its planetarium variation, is highly speculative and more aligned with theological theories. One possible counterargument to the dissident (rogue) group argument is that extraterrestrial artificial superintelligences dominate space, including space occupied by biological intelligences; moreoever, separate artificial superintelligences are assumed to tend towards a network of merged superintelligencies, thereby dissuading rogue behaviour.

Appearance in fiction
The zoo hypothesis is a common theme in science fiction.

1930s
 1937: In Olaf Stapledon's 1937 novel Star Maker, great care is taken by the Symbiont race to keep its existence hidden from "pre-utopian" primitives, "lest they should lose their independence of mind.” It is only when such worlds become utopian-level space travellers that the Symbionts make contact and bring the young utopia to an equal footing.

1950s
 1951: Arthur C. Clarke's The Sentinel (first published in 1951) and its later novel adaptation 2001: A Space Odyssey (1968) feature a beacon which is activated when the human race discovers it on the moon.
 1953: In Childhood's End, a novel by Arthur C. Clarke published in 1953, the alien cultures had been observing and registering Earth's evolution and human history for thousands (perhaps millions) of years. At the beginning of the book, when mankind is about to achieve spaceflight, the aliens reveal their existence and quickly end the arms race, colonialism, racial segregation and the Cold War.

1960s
 In Star Trek, the Federation (including humans) has a strict Prime Directive policy of nonintervention with less technologically advanced cultures which the Federation encounters. The threshold of inclusion is the independent technological development of faster-than-light propulsion. In the show's canon, the Vulcan race limited their encounters to observation until Humans made their first warp flight, after which they initiated first contact, indicating the practice predated the Human race's advance of this threshold. Additionally, in the episode "The Chase (TNG)", a message from a first (or early) civilization is discovered, hidden in the DNA of sentient species spread across many worlds, something that could only have been fully discovered after a race had become sufficiently advanced.

 In Hard to Be a God by Arkady and Boris Strugatsky, the (unnamed) medieval-esque planet where the novel takes action is protected by the advanced civilization of Earth, and the observers from Earth present on the planet are forbidden to intervene and make overt contact. One of the major themes of the novel is the ethical dilemma presented by such a stance to the observers.

1980s
 1986: In Speaker for the Dead by Orson Scott Card, the human xenobiologists and xenologers, biologists and anthropologists observing alien life, are forbidden from giving the native species, the Pequeninos, any technology or information. When one of the xenobiologists is killed in an alien ceremony, they are forbidden to mention it. This happens again until Ender Wiggin, the main character of Ender's Game, explains to the Pequeninos that humans cannot partake in the ceremony because it kills them. While this is not exactly an example of the zoo hypothesis, since humanity makes contact, it is very similar and the humans seek to keep the Pequeninos ignorant of technology.
 1987: In Julian May's 1987 novel Intervention, the five alien races of the Galactic Milieu keep Earth under surveillance, but do not intervene until humans demonstrate mental and ethical maturity through a paranormal prayer of peace.
 1989: Iain M. Banks' The State of the Art depicts the Culture secretly visiting Earth and then deciding to leave it uncontacted, watching its development as a control group, to confirm whether their manipulations of other civilizations are ultimately for the best (the laboratory hypothesis). Other works by Banks depict the Culture (or a Culture equivalent) routinely manipulating less advanced civilizations, including pre-industrial ones (e.g., Inversions), both covertly and overtly, for philosophical or foreign policy purposes.
 1989: Bill Watterson's Calvin and Hobbes comic strip for 8 November 1989, alludes to the possibility of an ethical threshold for first contact (or at least for the prudence of first contact) in Calvin's remark "Sometimes I think the surest sign that intelligent life exists elsewhere in the universe is that none of it has tried to contact us."

2000s
 2000: In Robert J. Sawyer's SF novel Calculating God (2000), Hollus, a scientist from an advanced alien civilization, denies that her government is operating under the prime directive.
 2003: In South Park inaugural episode of season seven, "Cancelled", aliens refrain from contacting Earth because the planet is the subject and setting of a reality television show. Unlike most variations of the zoo hypothesis where contact is not initiated in order to allow organic socioeconomic, cultural, and technological development, the aliens in this episode refrain from contact for the sole purpose of entertainment. In essence, the aliens treat all of Earth like the titular character in The Truman Show in order to maintain the show's integrity.
 2008: In the video game Spore, which simulates the evolution and life of species on a fictional galaxy, intelligent species in the "Space Stage" cannot contact those in previous stages, which did not unify their planets, nor develop spaceflight yet. However, they are allowed to abduct their citizens/members, to create crop circles in their terrain and to place in their planets a tool called "monolith", which accelerates their technological evolution.

2010s 

 2012: In the sci-fi video game Star Citizen, the zoo hypothesis is vaguely referenced in a lore point and is referred to as the Fair Chance Act. In the document, humans are generally forbidden from terraforming, mining, and inhabiting planets if the world is found to harbor lifeforms capable of developing intelligence. Multiple planetary systems are planned to be implemented as the game's active development continues that will feature planets protected under the Fair Chance Act.

 2016: In the video game Stellaris, players control an interstellar empire that can encounter less technologically advanced, non-space faring civilizations. Depending on player choices and their empire's organization, they can observe such "pre faster-than-light" planets in a manner similar to the zoo hypothesis, using science stations with missions that can include passive observation, technological enlightenment, covert infiltration and indoctrination. Players can also discover "pre-sapient" species, which can be uplifted to sentience using scientific research projects.

References

Extraterrestrial life
Hypotheses
Fermi paradox
Biological hypotheses
Search for extraterrestrial intelligence